Horia fabriciana, is a species of blister beetle found in India, Sri Lanka and Egypt.

Description
Body length is about 20 mm. Head with sparse punctures and fine, dense pubescence. Pronotum with fine dense punctures with fine sparse pubescence. Legs consists with weekly compressed tarsi. Ventrum with long pubescence which become denser in thorax and sparse in abdomen. Male has deeply emarginate fifth visible abdominal sternum and round narrow pygidium. Female has emarginate sixth visible abdominal sternum.

References 

Meloidae
Insects of Sri Lanka
Insects of India
Insects described in 1929